Rhipidolestes is a genus of damselflies in the family Rhipidolestidae. They are native to subtropical Asia from Burma to Japan.

It is a distinctive genus characterized by the unique tubercle on the ninth abdominal segment of the male. Many have yellow or reddish legs and they generally rest with their wings open, unlike most other Asian species.

Species

 Rhipidolestes aculeatus Ris, 1912
 Rhipidolestes alleni Wilson, 2000
 Rhipidolestes amamiensis Ishida, 2005
 Rhipidolestes asatoi Asahina, 1994
 Rhipidolestes bastiaani Zhu & Yang, 1998
 Rhipidolestes chaoi Wilson, 2004
 Rhipidolestes cyanoflavus Wilson, 2000
 Rhipidolestes fascia Zhou, 2003
 Rhipidolestes hiraoi Yamamoto, 1955
 Rhipidolestes janetae Wilson, 1997
 Rhipidolestes jucundus Lieftinck, 1948
 Rhipidolestes laui Wilson & Reels, 2003
 Rhipidolestes lii Zhou, 2003
 Rhipidolestes malaisei Lieftinck, 1948
 Rhipidolestes nectans (Needham, 1929)
 Rhipidolestes okinawanus Asahina, 1951
 Rhipidolestes owadai Asahina, 1997
 Rhipidolestes pallidistigma (Fraser, 1926)
 Rhipidolestes rubripes (Navás, 1936)
 Rhipidolestes shozoi Ishida, 2005
 Rhipidolestes truncatidens Schmidt, 1931
 Rhipidolestes yakusimensis Asahina, 1951
 Rhipidolestes yangbingi Davies, 1998

References

Zygoptera genera
Taxonomy articles created by Polbot